Petar Nikolov Drenchev (born 25 April 1977) is a Bulgarian chess player who received the FIDE title of Grandmaster (GM) in 2011. He is a professional chess player, who graduated from the National Sports Academy as a chess coach.

References

External links
 
 
 

1977 births
Living people
Bulgarian chess players
Chess grandmasters
People from Kazanlak